Johan Buttedahl (born 5 October 1935) is a Norwegian dentist and politician for the Centre Party. He was a member of the Parliament of Norway from 1981 to 1989, representing Buskerud. From 1989 he was appointed "county dentist" of Buskerud.

References

1935 births
Living people
Politicians from Drammen
Members of the Storting
Centre Party (Norway) politicians
Buskerud politicians
Norwegian dentists
20th-century Norwegian politicians